In 1692, the Church of England, also known as the Anglican Church, became the established church of the Province of Maryland through an Act of the General Assembly. Ten counties had been established in the colony, and those counties were divided into 30 parishes. After the American Revolutionary War, they became part of the Episcopal Diocese of Maryland, which split off the Episcopal Diocese of Easton in 1868 and the Episcopal Diocese of Washington in 1895.

The following is a sortable List of the original 30 Anglican parishes in the Province of Maryland.

See also
 List of post 1692 Anglican parishes in the Province of Maryland

Notes

Footnotes

Citations

References

External links
 Skirven, Percy G., The First Parishes of the Province of Maryland, Baltimore: Norman Remington Co., 1923